Major General William Earle  (18 May 1833 – 10 February 1885) was a British Army officer of the 19th century.

Military career
He had a successful military career, recognised by honours including a Companion of the Order of the Bath.
He fought in the Crimean War and was later part of the Nile Expedition attempting to relieve General Gordon at Khartoum. He was killed following the Battle of Kirbekan.

Personal life
He was born in Liverpool, the son of the merchant Sir Hardman Earle, 1st Baronet and his wife Mary (née Langton). He married Mary Codrington, daughter of William Codrington on 21 July 1864. His grandfather was the slave trader Thomas Earle.

Legacy
There is a bronze statue of him outside St George's Hall, Liverpool, by sculptor Charles Bell Birch. There is also a stone bust of General Earle at St Mark's Anglican Church in Alexandria, Egypt.  This bust is mentioned by E. M. Forster in his Alexandria: A History and a Guide, and by Lawrence Durrell in his novel Justine, the first volume of The Alexandria Quartet.

References

1833 births
1885 deaths
Companions of the Order of the Bath
Younger sons of baronets
British Army personnel of the Crimean War
Engineers from Liverpool
49th Regiment of Foot officers
British Army major generals
British Army personnel of the Mahdist War
British military personnel killed in the Mahdist War